William Henry Namack (March 8, 1876 – September 24, 1933) was an American football player and coach. He served as the head football coach at Washington Agricultural College and School of Science—now Washington State University—for one season in 1901, compiling a record of 4–1.
  Namack died on September 24, 1933, at Springfield Hospital in Springfield, Massachusetts.

Head coaching record

References

External links
 

1876 births
1933 deaths
Cornell Big Red football players
Washington State Cougars football coaches
People from Phelps, New York